The Bruce-Gardner Baronetcy, of Frilford in the County of Berkshire, is a title in the Baronetage of the United Kingdom. It was created on 12 February 1945 for Charles Bruce-Gardner. He was Industrial Advisor to the Governor of the Bank of England from 1930 to 1938 and Chairman of the Society of British Aircraft Constructors from 1938 to 1943.

Bruce-Gardner baronets, of Frilford (1945)
Sir Charles Bruce-Gardner, 1st Baronet (1887–1960)
Sir Douglas Bruce Bruce-Gardner, 2nd Baronet (1917–1997)
Sir Robert Henry Bruce-Gardner, 3rd Baronet (1943-2017)
Sir Edmund Thomas Peter Bruce-Gardner, 4th Baronet (born 1982)

Notes

References
Kidd, Charles, Williamson, David (editors). Debrett's Peerage and Baronetage (1990 edition). New York: St Martin's Press, 1990, 

Bruce-Gardner